Paracymoriza reductalis is a moth in the family Crambidae. It was described by Aristide Caradja in 1925. It is found in the Chinese provinces of Guangdong, Hainan and Sichuan.

References

Acentropinae
Moths described in 1925